WEBB is a country formatted FM radio station licensed to Waterville, Maine. It is owned by Townsquare Media, and broadcasts on 98.5 FM. It used to be simulcast on AM 1490 WTVL. Its studios are located along with WMME-FM, WTVL, and WJZN in Augusta. The station's signal can also be received in parts of the Bangor market. On air personalities include Buzz and Brittany in the Morning, Buzz Bradley, Brittany Rose, Quinn Alexander, and Sam Alex.

References

External links

EBB
Country radio stations in the United States
Waterville, Maine
Radio stations established in 1968
Townsquare Media radio stations